Bolshoye Ugryumovo is a rural locality (a village) in Malyshevskoye Rural Settlement, Selivanovsky District, Vladimir Oblast, Russia. The population was 29 as of 2010.

Geography 
Bolshoye Ugryumovo is located 32 km southwest of Krasnaya Gorbatka (the district's administrative centre) by road. Drachyovo is the nearest rural locality.

References 

Rural localities in Selivanovsky District